Cedric Earl Henderson (born March 11, 1975) is an American former professional basketball player who played five seasons in the National Basketball Association (NBA).

Career
A 6'7" small forward, Henderson starred at the University of Memphis, and was selected by the Cleveland Cavaliers in the second round (45th pick overall) of the 1997 NBA draft.  He played four seasons (1997/98–2000/01) for the Cavaliers before being traded to the Golden State Warriors, with whom he played in 2001/02.

Before the 2002–03 NBA season he was signed as a free agent by the Milwaukee Bucks, but he was waived after one month.

After he left the NBA, he went to play in the NBDL, France (Division 1), Lebanon (Bluestars), Cyprus and Ukraine.

Coaching career
After retiring, Henderson became the assistant coach and head coach of the men's basketball team at Southwest Tennessee Community College for the 2012–2013 and 2018–2019 seasons, respectively. After Southwest Tennessee Community College he was an assistant coach of the men's basketball team at Christian Brothers University for the 2020–2021 season. He, also, coached high school teams in Memphis. In 2013–2014, he was the head coach at Wooddale High School and the team finished with a 9–16 season. And in 2017–2018, he coached at Trezevant High School where the team had a 2–20 record.

On October 25, 2021, Henderson was named the interim head coach at Collierville High School in Collierville, Tennessee. On January 20, 2022, he resigned as interim head coach following an internal investigation and reported potential failure to adhere to Collierville Schools Coaches' Code of Conduct Policy. According to the investigation, Mr. Roger Jones, Collierville High School's principal, considered Henderson's comments and language to the basketball team "inappropriate" and said “It has no place in the program and should not be spoken to kids.” Henderson responded that the audio of him submitted as a part of the investigation was "recorded without his consent" and he feels it was "edited to make him look bad".

Personal life
Henderson received his Bachelor of Interdisciplinary Studies from The University of Memphis in 2008. He became a member of Kappa Alpha Psi in 2021. Henderson's son, Cedric Henderson, Jr., is a basketball player at University of Arizona.

References

r stats

1975 births
Living people
African-American basketball players
American expatriate basketball people in Cyprus
American expatriate basketball people in Lebanon
American expatriate basketball people in South Korea
American expatriate basketball people in Ukraine
American men's basketball players
Basketball players from Memphis, Tennessee
BC Khimik players
Cleveland Cavaliers draft picks
Cleveland Cavaliers players
Fayetteville Patriots players
Golden State Warriors players
Great Lakes Storm players
Huntsville Flight players
Keravnos B.C. players
McDonald's High School All-Americans
Memphis Tigers men's basketball players
Mobile Revelers players
Parade High School All-Americans (boys' basketball)
Small forwards
Seoul SK Knights players
Yakima Sun Kings players
Sagesse SC basketball players
21st-century African-American sportspeople
20th-century African-American sportspeople